Belle Montrose, born Isabelle Donohue in Illinois, (April 23, 1886 – October 26, 1964) was an Irish-American actress and vaudeville performer. She appeared on stage with her husband Carroll Abler (stage name: Billy Allen, 1888–1923) in the comedy team of Allen and Montrose (with Allen as the straight man), touring with the Orpheum vaudeville circuit.

On December 26, 1921, Montrose and Carroll Abler became the parents of Steve Allen. After Carroll Abler died in 1923, young Steve Allen began living with the Montrose family on Chicago's South Side, near Hyde Park, while his mother toured. After Carroll's death, Belle continued in vaudeville, working as a solo act and with other comedians. In 1925, the 17-year-old comedian Milton Berle toured with Montrose.

Years later, Steve Allen wrote about her in his memoir, Mark It and Strike It: An Autobiography (1960).

Television
Milton Berle once described Montrose as "the funniest woman in vaudeville." In her later years, Montrose acted on television, including several appearances on Steve Allen's Sunday show (1956–59), The Steve Allen Plymouth Show (1959–60), and later on The New Steve Allen Show (1961). She was a regular on The Hathaways (1961), starring Peggy Cass and Jack Weston.

Films
Montrose's movie credits include The Absent-Minded Professor (1961) and its sequel Son of Flubber (1963).

At the age of 78 Montrose died of a heart attack in Hollywood. She is buried in San Fernando Mission Cemetery in San Fernando, California, not far from actor Walter Brennan.

Filmography

References

Sources
Allen, Steve. Mark It and Strike It: An Autobiography, 1960.
Steve Allen, Jr. MD

External links

1886 births
1964 deaths
American people of Irish descent
American television actresses
American film actresses
Vaudeville performers
20th-century American actresses